The social project School Card is Russian national one dealing with implementation and adaptation in all schools of the Russian Federation the access control systems, non-cash payment of school meal, e-diary. The project was started in March 2011. The purpose of the project is consolidation of the efforts in the field of safety, school meal, academic achievement records, informational and automation support of educational process powered by system «School card». The project is developing in accordance with Federal State Educational Standards.

References

Education in Russia